Judith or Judy Green may refer to:
 Judith Green (historian), English Anglo-Norman historian based at the University of Edinburgh
 Judith Green (swimmer) (born 1967), Australian Paralympic swimmer
 Judy Green (mathematician), logician and historian of women in mathematics
 Judy Green (socialite) (1931–2001), US novelist and philanthropist
 Judy Green (volleyball coach), head volleyball coach at the University of Alabama